Axel Gottfrid Leonard Billing (29 April 1841 – 14 January 1925) was a Swedish cleric and theologian who served as a member of the Swedish Academy, member of the Första kammaren in the Riksdag and served as Bishop of Lund from 1898 until 1925.

Early life
Billing was born at Önnestad in Kristianstad Municipality, the son of Magnus Billing and Hedvig Charlotta Collin. In the early 1860s Billing enrolled as a theology student at Lund University. Billing represented a very conservative political view that has sometimes been called Oscarian after King Oscar II. In 1881 he became professor of practical theology at Lund University.

Bishop
In 1884, he was appointed Bishop of Västerås and was consecrated on 7 September 1884 by Archbishop Anton Niklas Sundberg. In Västerås, he deepened his contacts with the royal family. He also represented Västerås in the parliament's first chamber on the conservative bench. In 1900, after the death of Anton Niklas Sundberg, Billing was offered the position of Archbishop of Uppsala, however he declined. He accepted to take over Sundberg's place in the Swedish Academy, a post he kept until his death in 1925. In 1898 he was appointed Bishop of Lund.

Billing was elected as a member of the Royal Swedish Academy of Sciences in 1908 and the Royal Society of the Humanities at Lund in 1919. He was awarded an honorary doctorate in Lund on 28 September 1918 and received the Royal Order of the Seraphim on 6 June 1921.

Personal life
In 1868 he married Frida Bring, daughter of Bishop Ebbe Gustaf Bring of Linköping, and Ulla Ehrenborg, sister of the writer Betty Ehrenborg. He was the father of Einar Billing.  Bishop of Västerås  and the father-in-law of Bishop Edvard Magnus Rodhe, Bishop of Lund.
Billing died in 1925 and was buried at Norra kyrkogården in Lund.

References

1841 births
1925 deaths
People from Kristianstad Municipality
Lund University alumni
Academic staff of Lund University
Lutheran bishops of Lund
19th-century Lutheran bishops
Swedish theologians
Members of the Riksdag
Members of the Swedish Academy